Transport Asset Holding Entity of New South Wales (TAHE) is a state-owned corporation of the New South Wales Government in New South Wales, Australia, established under the Transport Administration Act 1988. It was converted and renamed from RailCorp on 1 July 2020. As a state-owned corporation, it is not an agency or division of Transport for NSW.

Like its predecessor RailCorp, the TAHE holds rail property assets, rolling stock and rail infrastructure in the Sydney metropolitan area and limited country locations in the state and it makes these assets available to Sydney Trains and NSW TrainLink for their operations. Its asset base consists of "rail embankments, cuttings and tunnels, track, signals, power systems, rolling stock, stations and significant land holdings around stations" across the state. A sister entity, the Residual Transport Corporation (RTC), which was formed in July 2017, owns assets not suitable for TAHE ownership.

The TAHE will eventually own the state's public transport assets, including ferries.

Board of Directors
As a statutory state-owned corporation in New South Wales, the TAHE has a board of directors that is made up of the secretary of Transport for NSW and 3 to 7 directors appointed by the voting shareholders. The directors may also include the chief executive of TAHE, currently Benedicte Colin .

Controversies
TAHE has been the subject of an investigation by the NSW Legislative Council public accountability committee. The Financial Review report stated: "Faced with the new accounting standards, PwC instead recommended either the whole TfNSW portfolio be fully corporatised or the TAHE proposal be dropped." noting that currently only 30% of costs were recovered.

See also

List of New South Wales government agencies

References

External links
Transport Asset Holding Entity of New South Wales
 ABN 59 325 778 353 - ASIC Register

Government agencies of New South Wales
Railway companies of New South Wales
Railway infrastructure companies of Australia
Railway companies established in 2020
Australian companies established in 2020